Uwe Ackermann (born 12 September 1960 in Zwickau, Bezirk Karl-Marx-Stadt) is a retired East German hurdler.

He won the bronze medal at the 1982 European Championships with 48.64 seconds.

His personal best time was 48.50 seconds, achieved in July 1982 in Karl-Marx-Stadt. This ranks him fourth among German 400 m hurdlers, behind Harald Schmid, Olaf Hense and Edgar Itt.

Uwe Ackermann represented the sports team SC Karl-Marx-Stadt and became East German champion in 1982, 1987 and 1988.

References 

1960 births
Living people
People from Zwickau
People from Bezirk Karl-Marx-Stadt
East German male hurdlers
Sportspeople from Saxony
European Athletics Championships medalists